Marie Kunert (20 May 1871 – 28 May 1957) was a German socialist politician and educator. She was a member of the Landtag of Prussia from 1921 until 1928 and member of the Reichstag during the Weimar Republic from 1928 to 1933. In 1933, Kunert went into exile in Switzerland and never returned to Germany.

Biography
Kunert was born on 20 May 1871 as Marie Bombe in the 3rd District (Wedding) of Berlin. She became a teacher in English and French, and also worked as a translator. In 1890, she married .

In 1917, Kunert became a member of the Independent Social Democratic Party (USPD), a centrist Marxist party. In 1918, she became an editor for the press office of the Soviet Embassy. In 1921, Kunert was elected to Landtag of Prussia. In 1922, she changed to the Social Democratic Party. Kunert served in the Landtag until 1928 when she was elected to the Reichstag of the Weimar Republic. She was re-elected four times and served until 1933. In 1931, her husband died. In 1933, the Nazi Party came to power, and Kunert went into exile in Switzerland. She never returned to Germany.

On 28 May 1957, Kunert died at the age of 86 in Berlingen.

References

1871 births
1957 deaths
Independent Social Democratic Party politicians
Social Democratic Party of Germany politicians
Members of the Reichstag of the Weimar Republic
Politicians from Berlin
German communists
German expatriates in Switzerland
German women educators
20th-century German educators